The men's 440 yard freestyle was a swimming event held as part of the Swimming at the 1904 Summer Olympics programme. It was the first time the event was held at the Olympics, and the only time yards were used instead of metres. The length of 440 yards (402.336 metres) was slightly longer than the 400 metres that would be used in every subsequent edition of the swimming programme.

4 swimmers from 3 nations competed.

Results

Final

References

Sources
 

Swimming at the 1904 Summer Olympics